Dino Bergens (born August 31, 1969 in Paramaribo, Suriname) is a Dutch-Surinamese retired professional basketball player who played for various Eredivisie teams from the late 1980s into the 2000s.

Career 
 Nashua Den Bosch 1987-1990
 Festo BVV 1990-1991
 Donar Groningen 1991-1994
 Den Bosch 1994-1997
 De Dunckers 1997-1998
 BC Omniworld 2003-2006.

In 2022, Bergens was youth coach of BC Apollo

References

External links
eurobasket.com profile

1969 births
Almere Pioneers players
Living people
Dutch men's basketball players
Surinamese emigrants to the Netherlands
Dutch Basketball League players
Sportspeople from Paramaribo
Surinamese men's basketball players
Point guards